Edwin Wiley Grove (1850–1927) was a self-made millionaire and entrepreneur. He founded the Paris Medicine Company, creating and producing its most well-known patent medicine products, Grove’s Tasteless Chill Tonic and Laxative Bromo Quinine tablets. He later invested in and developed properties in cities in the U.S. South, including Atlanta, Georgia, and Asheville, North Carolina.  

Grove's Tasteless Chill Tonic, which was first sold in 1885, was a fever-remedy made from quinine suspended in a flavored syrup to eliminate the bitter taste.  The tasteless chill tonic, which some claimed was not all that tasteless, was an improvement over taking straight quinine for fevers and chills caused by malaria. It contained cinchonine, cinchonidine, reduced iron, with sweet syrup and lemon flavor in a suspension that required shaking before use.  Some sources claim that by 1890 more bottles of Grove's Tasteless Chill Tonic were sold than bottles of Coca-Cola.

“I had a little drug business in Paris, Tennessee, just barely making a living, when I got up a real invention, tasteless quinine. As a poor man and a poor boy, I conceived the idea that whoever could produce a tasteless chill tonic, his fortune was made.” — E.W. Grove 

Grove’s Laxative Bromo Quinine, which was first produced in 1896, was an early cold tablet that combined quinine with other ingredients thought to relieve cold symptoms, including bromide (a sedative) and a laxative. Although complete contents of the original tablets were not revealed, later formulations contained (in addition to quinine and bromide) phenolphthalein as the laxative, an analgesic such as acetanilide or phenacetin, and medicinal plant extracts. The success of Grove’s products can be partly attributed to his talent for advertising. The Bromo Quinine cold tablets were sold in a package that bore the signature of E W Grove, thereby ensuring the buyer of the authenticity (and implied quality) of the product.

Between 1902 and 1905, Grove bought land in Atlanta which he developed in 1912 as the streetcar suburb Atkins Park, named after family friend and mentor Colonel John DeWitt Clinton Atkins. Later he developed the Fortified Hills suburb in Atlanta, now the Grove Park neighborhood of Atlanta.

In Paris, Tennessee, Grove endowed a public high school, the E.W. Grove Henry County High School, which opened in 1906. 

After visiting Asheville, NC, in 1897 Grove built a summer home there and later moved there permanently. He developed the Grove Park residential area and built the Grove Park Inn with his son-in-law Fred Loring Seely in 1913. He later built the new Battery Park Hotel in downtown Asheville (on the site of the former hotel of the same name) and began construction of the Grove Arcade, a new kind of indoor retail center, which was completed in 1929 after his death. Grove died at the Battery Park Hotel in 1927.

References

Further reading
 Dr. Edwin Wiley Grove at www.ewgrove.com
 Edwin Wiley Grove in the Tennessee Encyclopedia of History and Culture

American hoteliers
People from Paris, Tennessee
1850 births
1927 deaths
Patent medicine businesspeople
American health care businesspeople
American real estate businesspeople